Mohamed Hikem (born April 12, 1992 in Draâ Ben Khedda) is an Algerian football player. He currently plays for MC Alger in the Algerian Ligue Professionnelle 1.

Club career
On October 15, 2011, Hikem made his professional debut for JS Kabylie as a 90th-minute substitute in a league match against AS Khroub. Two weeks later, he made his second appearance for the club, this time as a 73rd-minute substitute against USM El Harrach.

References

External links
 
 

1992 births
Living people
Algerian footballers
Algerian Ligue Professionnelle 1 players
JS Kabylie players
Kabyle people
People from Tizi Ouzou Province
Association football central defenders
21st-century Algerian people